X Crucis is a classical Cepheid variable star in the southern constellation of Crux.

X Crucis is a pulsating variable star with am extremely regular amplitude and period. Its apparent magnitude varies from 8.1 to 8.7 every 6.22 days. This type of variable is known as a Cepheid after δ Cephei, the first example to be discovered. X Crucis is a population I star and so is a classical or type I Cepheid variable, to be distinguished from older low-mass stars called type II Cepheid variables.

Classical Cepheids pulsate radially so that their size varies. X Crucis pulsates in its fundamental mode and its properties indicate that it is crossing the instability strip for the third time as its evolves back to cooler temperatures. Its radius varies by about  during each cycle, approximately 8% of its mean radius. At the same time its temperature varies between 5,180 and 6,029 K. The radius and temperature do not vary in sync, with the smallest size occurring as the temperature is approaching its maximum. The brightness increases rapidly to a maximum when the star is hottest, then decreases more slowly. This is one of the properties that indicate fundamental mode pulsation.

References

Crux (constellation)
Classical Cepheid variables
Crucis, X
J12462227-5907290
110945
G-type supergiants
Durchmusterung objects